Hidenori Hasegawa ( Hasegawa Hidenori; March 6, 1938 – May 8, 2022) was a Japanese politician. An independent, he served in the Tokyo Metropolitan Assembly from 1989 to 1993. He died on 8 May 2022 at the age of 84.

References

1938 births
2022 deaths
20th-century Japanese politicians
Members of the Tokyo Metropolitan Assembly
Waseda University alumni
Politicians from Nagano Prefecture